New York's 5th State Senate district is one of 63 districts in the New York State Senate. It has  been represented by Democrat Jim Gaughran since 2019, following his defeat of incumbent Republican Carl Marcellino.

Geography
District 5 covers much of Long Island's North Shore in Nassau County and Suffolk County, including northern Huntington and Oyster Bay, as well as the city of Glen Cove.

The district is located entirely within New York's 3rd congressional district, and overlaps with the 10th, 12th, 13th, 15th, and 19th districts of the New York State Assembly.

Recent election results

2020

2018

2016

2014

2012

Federal results in District 5

References

05